Tenagodus squamatus is a species of sea snail, a marine gastropod mollusk in the family Siliquariidae.

Distribution

Description 
The maximum recorded shell length is 170 mm.

Habitat 
Minimum recorded depth is 0 m. Maximum recorded depth is 732 m.

References

External links

Siliquariidae
Gastropods described in 1827